The 1925–26 National Hurling League was the first edition of the National Hurling League, which ran from 27 September 1925 until 16 May 1926.

The seven participating teams were Cork, Dublin, Galway, Kilkenny, Laois, Limerick and Tipperary who agreed to play a six game format whereby each team would play each of their six rivals once with two points awarded for a win and one point awarded for a drawn game. The two teams with most points at the completion of the season would play a final, with the winners being declared National Hurling League champions.

Cork defeated Dublin by 3-7 to 1-5 in the final.

Cork also won the All-Ireland Championship in 1926, the first time that a team completed the league-championship double.

National Hurling League

Table

This is an incomplete table based on available results.

Results

External links
 1925-26 National Hurling League results

References

National Hurling League seasons
League
League